The Fiat G.18 was an Italian airliner developed in the mid-1930s.

Design 
It was a conventional low-wing monoplane with twin engines mounted on the wings, similar in appearance to the Douglas DC-2. The main units of the tailwheel undercarriage retracted into the engine nacelles, leaving their wheels partially exposed. The cabin seated 18 passengers.

Service history 
Three G.18s were put into service with Fiat's own airline, ALI, early in 1936; the feedback received was that the type was underpowered. Fiat responded the following year with a revised version, the G.18V which had more powerful engines, and a redesigned fin and long dorsal strake. Six of these were delivered to ALI, which operated them on its European routes until the outbreak of war.

In June 1940, ALI was brought under control of the Regia Aeronautica (Royal Italian Air Force), and the G.18s were put to use as transports. Among other operations, they flew troops to Albania in November 1940 as part of the campaign against Greece. By the time of the Italian armistice, only one remained in operation, with another three captured by Germany, and a fifth aircraft in use by the remaining Italian Fascist forces. This latter aircraft was involved in a major accident on 30 April 1944 when, loaded with munitions, it exploded on the runway at Bresso. The blast caused considerable damage to the airfield.

Variants
 G.18 - original version with Fiat A.59 engines (3 built)
 G.18V - revised version with Fiat A.80 engines (6 built)

Operators

Avio Linee Italiane (ALI)
Regia Aeronautica

Specifications (G.18V)

See also

References

Sources

External links

 
 

G.018
1930s Italian airliners
Low-wing aircraft
Aircraft first flown in 1935
Twin piston-engined tractor aircraft
World War II Italian transport aircraft